Sunrays is a super-yacht built in 2010 at the Dutch shipyard Oceanco. The interior design of Sunrays was done by Terence Disdale and the exterior work was done by Bjorn Johansson. The Sunrays yacht can accommodate up to 16 guests and has a crew of 28.

Design 
The materials of the hull is steel, while the superstructure is made out of Aluminium with teak laid decks. The yacht is Lloyd's registered, issued by Cayman Islands.

Engines 
The main engines are two MTU 16V 595 TE70 with a power of  each.

See also 
 Motor yacht
 List of motor yachts by length
 List of yachts built by Oceanco
 Oceanco

References 

2009 ships
Motor yachts
Ships built in the Netherlands